Weeping Wall may refer to:

 Weeping Wall (Alberta), a geologic formation in Banff National Park, Alberta, Canada
 Weeping Wall (Montana), a geologic formation in Glacier National Park, Montana, United States
 "Weeping Wall" (instrumental), a 1977 instrumental song by David Bowie